The women's 800 metres event at the 2015 European Athletics U23 Championships was held in Tallinn, Estonia, at Kadriorg Stadium on 9 and 11 July.

Medalists

Results

Final
11 July

Heats
9 July

Heat 1

Heat 2

Heat 3

Participation
According to an unofficial count, 17 athletes from 13 countries participated in the event.

References

800 metres
800 metres at the European Athletics U23 Championships